Bhim Sen Sachar (1 December 1894 – 18 January 1978) was an Indian politician who served three times as the Chief Minister of Punjab.

Early life
Sachar was born on 1 December 1894. He did BA and LLB in Lahore and practiced law in Gujranwala, which is now in Pakistan. He was attracted to the freedom movement and joined the Indian National Congress party at a young age. In 1921, he was elected as the Secretary of Punjab Pradesh Congress Committee. By the time India gained independence in 1947, he was an important member of the party.

Years in Pakistan
Around the time of Independence, Sachar accepted citizenship of Pakistan and became a member of the First Pakistan Constituent Assembly. He later relinquished the Pakistan citizenship and returned to India.

Back in India
In 1949, the Congress selected him for the office of Chief Minister of Punjab. He took oath on 13 April 1949 and served until 18 October 1949. However, bitter factional politics in the state party unit between Gopi Chand Bhargava and Sachar led to the first ever imposition of President's rule in any state in India under Article 365 of Indian Constitution. 

The first elections in independent India were held in 1952 and the Punjab legislative assembly was formed for the first time that year. The Congress party won the provincial elections at this time, and Sachar became chief minister again, serving from  17 April 1952 to 23 January 1956.

Bhim Sen Sachar was the father-in-law of famous journalist  and former Indian Ambassador to the UK Kuldip Nayar.

After he demitted office (due to internal party politics), Sachar was named governor of Odisha by the union government. He served from 1956 to 1957. He was then named governor of Andhra Pradesh and served from 1957 to 1962.

During the Emergency, he was arrested and sent to jail with some other dissident leaders of Congress party, who belonged to the "old school" of the party and had spoken against the increasing authoritarianism of Indira Gandhi and her son Sanjay.

Personal life
Sachar was married at an early age to a girl of his own community, in a match arranged by parents. His son, Rajinder Sachar (b. 1923) was a lawyer and judge who served as Chief Justice of the Delhi High Court, and was famously the Chairman of the Sachar Committee which produced a  report on the status of religious minorities in India. Another son, Capt. Vijay Sachar of the Indian Army, was killed in action in Gaza, where he was serving in the Indian contingent of the UNEF. Veteran Indian journalist, left-wing activist and peace activist Kuldip Nayar was Sachar's son-in-law.

References

Indian National Congress politicians
Chief Ministers of Punjab, India
Governors of Andhra Pradesh
Governors of Odisha
1894 births
1978 deaths
People from Peshawar
Punjabi people
Punjab, India MLAs 1952–1957
Indians imprisoned during the Emergency (India)
Indian independence activists from Punjab (British India)
Prisoners and detainees of British India
Chief ministers from Indian National Congress